Daniel Francis "Dashing Dan" Costello (September 9, 1891–March 26, 1936) was a  Major League Baseball outfielder. In 154 career games, he had 85 hits, 24 RBIs and a .243 batting average. He batted left and threw right-handed. Costello was born in Jessup, Pennsylvania, and died in Pittsburgh, Pennsylvania.

External links

1891 births
1936 deaths
New York Yankees players
Pittsburgh Pirates players
Major League Baseball outfielders
Baseball players from Pennsylvania
Mount St. Mary's Mountaineers baseball players